Hippolyte-Dominique Berteaux (28 March 1843, Saint-Quentin, Aisne - 17 October 1926, Paris) was a French painter who specialized in murals and portraits.

Biography 
He studied painting at the École Nationale Supérieure des Beaux-Arts, where he worked in the studios of Hippolyte Flandrin, Léon Cogniet and Paul Baudry. From 1872 to 1875, he was employed as "Painter to the Sultan" in Istanbul. 

He then moved to Nantes, where he created portraits, genre scenes and landscapes; with the local dunes being a favorite subject. He also devoted himself to decorative painting. Later, he would decorate a ceiling section at the Petit Luxembourg.

After that, he would exhibit "out of competition". Beginning in 1901, he sent his works to be shown at the Salon of the Société Nationale des Beaux-Arts. 

In 1891, he was named a Knight in the Legion of Honor; becoming an Officer in 1923. 

He is interred at the Cimetière du Montparnasse.

Selected paintings

References

Further reading 
 Émilien Maillard, L'Art à Nantes au XIXe siècle, E. Monnier, Paris 1888
 Fernand Bertaux, Les Artistes picards: Études sur MM. Hippolyte Berteaux, Louis Debras, Jules Lefebvre, Francis Tattegrain, peintres, Emmanuel Fontaine, statuaire, E. Lechevalier, Paris, 1894

External links 

 More works by Berteaux @ ArtNet

1843 births
1926 deaths
19th-century French painters
French portrait painters
French muralists
Recipients of the Legion of Honour
People from Saint-Quentin, Aisne
20th-century French painters